Ron Noble (born January 25, 1960) is an American politician who served as a member of the Oregon House of Representatives for the 24th district, from 2017 to 2023.

Early life and education
Noble was born in Lynwood, California, in 1960. He attended Oregon State University and Seattle Pacific University, but did not earn a degree.

Career 
Noble served in the Corvallis police department from 1988 until 2006 and as McMinnville chief of police from 2006 until 2014. Noble won election to the Oregon House of Representatives in 2016, defeating Democratic candidate Ken Moore with 55% of the vote.

Personal life
Noble and his wife, Sue, have five children and nine grandchildren.

References

External links
 Campaign website
 Legislative website

1960 births
Candidates in the 2022 United States House of Representatives elections
Living people
Republican Party members of the Oregon House of Representatives
Oregon police officers
People from Lynwood, California
People from McMinnville, Oregon
21st-century American politicians
Oregon State University alumni
Seattle Pacific University alumni
American municipal police chiefs